The Brynica is a river in southern Poland.

Brynica may also refer to the following villages:
Brynica, Łódź Voivodeship (central Poland)
Brynica, Świętokrzyskie Voivodeship (south-central Poland)
Brynica, Kluczbork County in Opole Voivodeship (south-west Poland)
Brynica, Opole County in Opole Voivodeship (south-west Poland)